Paul Emil Lambert (born May 19, 1950) is a retired suffragan bishop of the Episcopal Diocese of Dallas. He was consecrated on July 12, 2008, and retired in May 2016.

See also
 List of Episcopal bishops of the United States
 List of bishops of the Episcopal Church in the United States of America

References

External links 
Diocese set to consecrate Paul Emil Lambert as its seventh bishop suffragan

1950 births
Living people
American Episcopalians
Episcopal bishops of Dallas